Kot Ise Khan is a town in Moga district of Indian state of Punjab.

Location
This town is located on Moga-Makhu section of National Highway 703B in Moga District. Moga is at a distance of 15 Kilometers from Kot Ise Khan. Other nearby towns are Zira, Makhu and Dharamkot.

References

Cities and towns in Moga district